Chemische Berichte (usually abbreviated as Ber. or Chem. Ber.) was a German-language scientific journal of all disciplines of chemistry founded in 1868. It was one of the oldest scientific  journals in chemistry, until it merged with Recueil des Travaux Chimiques des Pays-Bas to form Chemische Berichte/Recueil in 1997. Chemische Berichte/Recueil was then merged with other European journals in 1998 to form European Journal of Inorganic Chemistry.

History
Founded in 1868 as  Berichte der Deutschen Chemischen Gesellschaft (CODEN BDCGAS), it operated under this title until 1928 (Vol. 61). The journal was then split into:
 Berichte der Deutschen Chemischen Gesellschaft, A: Vereins-Nachrichten (CODEN BDCAAS), and
 Berichte der Deutschen Chemischen Gesellschaft, B: Abhandlungen (CODEN BDCBAD).
Vol. 78 and 79 (1945–1946) were omitted and not published due to World War II. The journal was renamed Chemische Berichte (CODEN CHBEAM) in 1947 (Vol. 80) until 1996 (Vol. 129).

In 1997, Chemische Berichte and Liebigs Annalen were merged with the Dutch journal Recueil des Travaux Chimiques des Pays-Bas to form Chemische Berichte/Recueil (CODEN CHBRFW) and Liebigs Annalen/Recueil (CODEN LIARFV).

In 1998, Chemische Berichte/Recueil merged with other European journals to form European Journal of Inorganic Chemistry, while Liebigs Annalen/Recueil and other European journals were merged to form European Journal of Organic Chemistry.

External links 

 Homepage of the German Society of Chemists (GDCh)

Chemistry journals
Publications established in 1868
Publications disestablished in 1997
Defunct journals
Academic journals associated with learned and professional societies
Wiley-VCH academic journals